San Isidro, officially the Municipality of San Isidro,  is a 5th class municipality in the province of Bohol, Philippines. According to the 2020 census, it has a population of 9,909 people.

This town is quite unique because it is the only town covered by the 2nd District surrounded by towns of the 1st District.

The town of San Isidro, Bohol celebrates its feast on May 15, to honor the town patron Saint Isidore the Laborer.

Geography

Barangays
San Isidro comprises 12 barangays. Of these, only Poblacion is classified as urban and the rest are rural.

Climate

Demographics

Economy

References

External links
 [ Philippine Standard Geographic Code]
San Isidro

Municipalities of Bohol
1969 establishments in the Philippines
Populated places established in 1969